Dub Side of the Moon is a dub reggae tribute to the 1973 Pink Floyd album, The Dark Side of the Moon, co-produced by Easy Star All-Stars founders Michael G (Michael Goldwasser) and Ticklah (Victor Axelrod). Easy Star All Stars released Dub Side of the Moon: Special Anniversary Edition, on CD and vinyl, on September 16, 2014.

Release details 
Included with the liner notes are instructions on how to synchronize the album with the 1939 film The Wizard of Oz and produce a variation of the perceived "Dark Side of the Rainbow" effect. The album has sold over 85,000 copies thus far and Easy Star All-Stars have been regularly touring in support of the album. Artist and Drummer Patrick Dougher performed on the recording but did not tour with the band.

A DVD of a live performance of Dub Side of the Moon was released by the Easy Star label in July 2006.

In 2010 the album was remixed in a bass-heavy dub style and reissued as Dubber Side of the Moon Easy Star All Stars released Dub Side of the Moon: Special Anniversary Edition on September 16, 2014.

Track listing 

The original vinyl LP album omitted the bonus tracks.

The 2014 version includes two further bonus tracks:

14.  "Breathe 2014" (bonus track)                                                                                                                                              5:29

.  15.  "Brain Dubbage" (bonus track)                                                                                                                                            4:22

Incidental music 
Easy Star All-Stars' version of "Time" was used as incidental music for a scene in the Steve Coogan comedy TV series, Saxondale.
 A piece of Easy Star All-Stars' version of "Time" can be heard in the background in the 2014 film The Gambler.

References

External links 
 Easy Star Records

2003 albums
Tributes to The Dark Side of the Moon
Easy Star All-Stars albums
Easy Star Records albums
Albums produced by Michael Goldwasser